William Clerke (by 1527–1587?), of Ponsbourne, Hertfordshire, was an English politician.

He was a Member (MP) of the Parliament of England for Wilton April 1554, November 1554,
1555, 1558 and 1572, for Calne in 1563 and for Devizes in 1571.

References

1587 deaths
People from Welwyn Hatfield (district)
English MPs 1554
English MPs 1554–1555
English MPs 1555
English MPs 1558
English MPs 1563–1567
English MPs 1571
English MPs 1572–1583
Year of birth uncertain